Fury of Your Lonely Heart is the fifth studio album by American indie rock group Get Set Go, first released to the public on September 20, 2011 via the group's self-run Square Tire Music label. Recorded over the summer of 2011 with recording costs paid for with fan donations via a KickStarter campaign, the album is the first by the group to feature bassist Jeremy Keeler, as well as the first released through the then-newly formed Square Tire Music. The album's cover artwork was done by the artist Dave Johnson, who also created the artwork for the group's 2003 debut album So You've Ruined Your Life.

Track listing

Personnel 
Michael "Mike TV" Torres – vocals, guitar, keyboards, percussion, production
Eric Summer – viola, vocals
Jeremy Keeler – bass
Dave Palamaro – drums
Dave Johnson – artwork

References

External links 
Fury of Your Lonely Heart on Bandcamp

2011 albums
Get Set Go albums